Urszula Łoś (born 18 February 1994) is a Polish professional track cyclist who specializes in short-term disciplines. She won a bronze medal in women's keirin at the 2018 UCI Track Cycling World Championships in London, United Kingdom. In 2019, together with her teammate Marlena Karwacka, she won a silver medal in women's team sprint event at 2019–20 UCI Track Cycling World Cup in Cambridge, New Zealand and a week later, they won a gold medal in the same competition at 2019–20 UCI Track Cycling World Cups in Brisbane, Australia. In the last event of 2019–20 UCI Track Cycling World Cup held in Milton, Canada the cyclists won a silver medal again, thereby winning the entire World Cup classification in women's team sprint.

References

External links
 

1994 births
Living people
Polish female cyclists
Place of birth missing (living people)
Cyclists at the 2019 European Games
European Games competitors for Poland
Olympic cyclists of Poland
Cyclists at the 2020 Summer Olympics
People from Pruszków
21st-century Polish women